Novelty is the second studio album by the American post-hardcore band Jawbox, released by Dischord Records in May 1992. The songs "Tongues" and "Ones and Zeros" were previously released as a single, and "Static" was featured on a split 7-inch with Tar. A video was produced for the track "Cutoff."

Novelty was the band's first album with guitar player Bill Barbot.

Critical reception

Trouser Press opined that "the mushy mix wastes the dual guitars, and [J] Robbins' vocals frequently seem dreary and monochromatic." The Washington Post wrote: "Punchy but hardly pop, such songs as 'Cutoff' and 'Static' possess both focus and bristling energy."

Track listing

Personnel 
J. Robbins - guitar, vocals
Kim Coletta - bass
Bill Barbot - guitar, background vocals
Adam Wade - drums

References 

Jawbox albums
1992 albums
Dischord Records albums
Albums produced by Iain Burgess